Trapp Family Austrian Relief, Inc. is an initiative founded by Georg von Trapp and Maria von Trapp of the famous Austrian singing family, the Trapp Family.

History
In January 1947, Major General Harry J. Collins turned to Georg von Trapp and Maria von Trapp in Stowe, Vermont, pleading for help for the Austrian people, having seen the residents of Salzburg suffer when he had arrived there with the famed 42nd Rainbow Division after World War II. The Trapp Family founded the Trapp Family Austrian Relief, Inc. Founders Georg and Maria von Trapp took on the posts of president and vice-president, while Monsignore Dr. Franz Wasner was appointed treasurer.

Awards 

In 1949 Pope Pius XII awarded Maria Augusta von Trapp the Benemerenti medal as a recognition for the Trapp Family Austrian Relief Inc.
On September 29, 2007, Tizzy von Trapp Walker, daughter of Rupert von Trapp, was honoured on behalf of the Trapp Family with the Egon Ranshofen-Wertheimer Award in Braunau am Inn within the scope of the 16th Braunau Contemporary History Days, for their work performed and their espousing Austria.

Reference

Aftermath of World War II in Austria
Trapp family
Humanitarian aid organizations of World War II